Toledo (Oruro) is a small town in Bolivia. Toledo is the administrative seat of Saucarí Province, as well as that of Toledo Municipality.

Geography
Toledo is located in the eastern part of the Bolivian altiplano, between the Serranía de Huayllamarca to the west and the Cordillera Azanaques to the east, which in turn is part of the Bolivian Cordillera Central of the Andes mountain range. The climate is cool and semi-arid, due to the elevation. The mean average temperature of the region is around 10 °C, and the monthly average values vary only slightly from 6 °C in June/July to just under 14 °C in November/December. Annual precipitation is only 400 mm, with a distinct dry season from May to August with monthly precipitation under 10 mm, and a short wet season from December to March with 60–85 mm monthly precipitation.

Transport network
In Oruro it intersects with the north-south Ruta 1 trunk road from Desaguadero via El Alto, Oruro and Potosí to Bermejo. In Ocotavi it meets Ruta 4, which heads east towards Cochabamba, Santa Cruz de la Sierra and Puerto Suárez on the Brazilian border.

References

Populated places in Oruro Department